Smithfield Plantation may refer to:

 Smithfield Plantation (Port Allen, Louisiana)
 Smithfield Plantation (Fredericksburg, Virginia)
 Smithfield (Blacksburg, Virginia)